Magnum Cars is a Canadian company that manufactures sports cars and racing cars. It was established in 1968. Magnum built two Formula Ford cars for Gilles Villeneuve.  Certain models are licensed for street use under an exception that permits low-volume manufactures to produce fewer than 20 cars per year.

References

Canadian racecar constructors
Sports car manufacturers
Canadian companies established in 1968